George Willis (1840  December 7, 1884) was a United States Navy sailor and a recipient of the United States military's highest decoration, the Medal of Honor.

Biography
Willis enlisted in the Navy from his birth state of Massachusetts and served as a coxswain aboard the  during the search for the missing exploration ship Polaris. When an Arctic gale struck Tigress off the coast of Greenland on the night of September 22, 1873, Willis volunteered to single-handedly furl (lower, roll up and secure) the loose fore topgallant sail, an act which prevented damage to the ship. For his conduct on that occasion, he was awarded the Medal of Honor.

Medal of Honor citation
Coxswain Willis' official Medal of Honor citation reads simply:
Serving on board the U.S.S. Tigress, Willis displayed gallant and meritorious conduct on the night of September 22, 1873 off the coast of Greenland.

See also

 List of Medal of Honor recipients
 List of Medal of Honor recipients during Peacetime

Notes

References

External links
 

1840 births
1884 deaths
United States Navy Medal of Honor recipients
People from Boston
United States Navy sailors
Non-combat recipients of the Medal of Honor